Kim Sung-oh (born September 15, 1978) is a South Korean actor. He is best known for his supporting roles in the television series Secret Garden and the film The Man from Nowhere. He was married in December 2014 to a non-entertainment person They have a son, Kim Ah-il (김아일).

Filmography

Film

Television series

Web series

Television shows

Music video

Radio drama

Awards and nominations

References

External links

 
 
 
 

South Korean male film actors
South Korean male stage actors
South Korean male television actors
21st-century South Korean male actors
1978 births
Living people